The 21 cm Kanone 38 (21 cm K 38) was a heavy gun used by Germany in World War II. Its development began in 1938 after Krupp's success with the 21 cm Mrs 18, but it was not fielded until 1941. It likely equipped Artillerie-Abteilungen 767 and 768, which were the only Heer battalions to field 21 cm guns during the war. Some guns may have served on coastal defence duties.

Design and history
It was generally similar in design to Krupp's 21 cm Mrs 18, but had an improved carriage that sped up emplacement and displacement times. It was transported in the customary two loads – barrel and carriage, although the carriage rode on two limbers. Each end of the carriage had inclined under-surfaces that rode on the limbers. When winched apart or together, those inclined surfaces allowed the carriage to easily raise out of or lower into position. It fired from a central platform stabilized by three jacks, which allowed all-around traverse.

Only eight were produced before the Heer decided that 21 cm was an unsuitable caliber and canceled the remaining seven guns under contract. One gun was sent to Japan by submarine.

Ammunition
The gun fired a  21 cm K Gr 38 HE shell. It used three individual bags of propellant in the cartridge case; they were not combined.

Notes

References
 Engelmann, Joachim and Scheibert, Horst. Deutsche Artillerie 1934–1945: Eine Dokumentation in Text, Skizzen und Bildern: Ausrüstung, Gliederung, Ausbildung, Führung, Einsatz. Limburg/Lahn, Germany: C. A. Starke, 1974
 Gander, Terry and Chamberlain, Peter. Weapons of the Third Reich: An Encyclopedic Survey of All Small Arms, Artillery and Special Weapons of the German Land Forces 1939–1945. New York: Doubleday, 1979 
 Hogg, Ian V. German Artillery of World War Two. 2nd corrected edition. Mechanicsville, PA: Stackpole Books, 1997 

World War II artillery of Germany
210 mm artillery
Weapons and ammunition introduced in 1940